Fatemeh Hashemi (born 1969) is an Iranian television actress.

Career
Fatemeh Hashemi is an Iranian actress. She born in Iran, Anzali port & completed her primary education.  She generally plays and acts in the genre of comedy on Iran television and appeared in movies & different television series like as Parvaz 57, Sa'ate khosh, Harf to Harf, Az khastegari ta Ezdevaj, Shabhaye Barareh, Ghahve-ye Talkh, Shoukhi Kardam.

 Selected filmography 

References

 
  'با مردم ناکجاآبادی بنام برره گفتگو با فاطمه هاشمی.]
  نگاهی به مجموعه جنجال برانگیز شبهای برره]، بی‌بی‌سی فارسی.
  «شب‌های برره»، پاییز روی آنتن تلویزیون]، وب‌گاه ترفند.
  - ۴۲k نگاهی به مجموعه جنجال برانگیز شبهای برره]، بی‌بی‌سی فارسی.
 ماهنامه سروش زنان''. شماره ۶۶: ۱۳۸۴

External links 
 

Living people
1969 births
People from Bandar-e Anzali
People from Tehran
Iranian film actresses
Iranian stage actresses
Iranian television actresses
20th-century Iranian actresses
21st-century Iranian actresses